Jamaica competed at the 2012 Summer Olympics in London, from 27 July to 12 August 2012. This was Jamaica's most successful performance in the Summer Olympics; it was approximately the same size from the previous games with a delegation of 50 athletes (25 men and 25 women), and its athletes broke the nation's record for the number of medals (all awarded in the track and field), won in a single games. Jamaica's participation in London marked its sixteenth appearance as an independent nation, although it had previously competed in four other games (including the 1948 debut in the same host city London) as a British colony, and as part of the West Indies Federation. Usain Bolt became the nation's greatest highlight of these games, having won three of Jamaica's four gold medals at London, and breaking an Olympic and world record in two of the three events in which he participated. Because of his repeated successes for the most medals and records, Bolt became Jamaica's first male flag bearer at the opening ceremony since 1984.

Overview
Jamaica's participation in these Olympic games marked its sixteenth appearance as an independent nation since 1964, although it had previously competed in four Olympic games under two different colonies; one as a British colony in 1948, when the nation marked its debut in the same host city for these games, and the other as part of the West Indies Federation, together with Trinidad and Tobago and Barbados.

Although the Jamaican athletes had won at every Olympic games since its debut, the nation's delegation to the London Olympics proved to be its most successful performance at any other Olympic games. It was represented by 50 athletes, competing only in 4 sports (athletics, equestrian, swimming, and taekwondo), which covered the same team size with the previous games. Despite the nation failed to target the number of gold medals from the previous games, Jamaica has created its historical record by winning the most Olympic medals in the overall standings (12 medals, surpassing the nation's performance at the 2008 Summer Olympics in Beijing by less than a single medal).

At these Olympic games, 18 athletes were awarded medals for their performance in events. Four of those athletes (Usain Bolt, Yohan Blake, Shelly-Ann Fraser-Pryce, and Veronica Campbell-Brown) received multiple medals, three of them were Olympic champions from Beijing. Being the greatest highlight in the track and field, Usain Bolt successfully defended his Olympic titles in London, after winning three gold medals in the same events he participated. He was able to break another Olympic record by the fastest time (9.63 seconds) in the men's 100 metres, and the world record, together with his team, in the men's 4 × 100 metres relay (36.84 seconds). Although he failed to break another record in the men's 200 metres, Bolt became the first athlete in Olympic history to successfully defend his title in that event, winning the gold medal. Two of his compatriots, Yohan Blake and Warren Weir had to settle for the silver and the bronze medal, respectively. This was the second time that all Jamaican athletes guaranteed the medal standings in a single event, the first in the women's 100 metres sprint at the Beijing games in 2008. Shelly-Ann Fraser-Pryce also defended her Olympic title by winning the gold medal in the women's 100 metres, ahead of her compatriot Veronica Campbell-Brown, and American sprinter Carmelita Jeter.

Among the 50 athletes competing in these Olympic games, three of them were from equestrian, swimming, and taekwondo. Samantha Albert, the nation's only equestrian rider, was the oldest of the team, at age 41. Swimmer Alia Atkinson, competing in the freestyle and breaststroke events, became the first to reach into the final after winning the swim-off showdown over Canada's Tera van Bailen in the women's 100 m breaststroke, but she narrowly missed the nation's first ever medal in swimming by finishing abruptly in fourth place. Jamaica also marked its debut in taekwondo, which was competed by Kenneth Edwards in the men's super heavyweight division.

Medalists

* - Heats only; ** - Finals only;

Athletics

Jamaican athletes have so far achieved qualifying standards in the following athletics events (up to a maximum of 3 athletes in each event at the 'A' Standard, and 1 at the 'B' Standard):

Men
Track & road events

Field events

Women
Track & road events

* Dominique Blake was selected to the relay team, but did not compete.

Field events

Equestrian

Eventing

Swimming

Swimmers have so far achieved qualifying standards in the following events (up to a maximum of 2 swimmers in each event at the Olympic Qualifying Time (OQT), and potentially 1 at the Olympic Selection Time (OST)):

Women

Legend = WSO Win swim-off; LSO Lost swim-off

Taekwondo

Jamaica has qualified 1 place in taekwondo.

References

External links

Nations at the 2012 Summer Olympics
2012
2012 in Jamaican sport